The PowerTrike II is a German ultralight trike, designed and produced by PowerTrike of Mackenbach. The aircraft is supplied as a complete ready-to-fly-aircraft.

As of 2014 the design is no longer indicated as available on the company website.

Design and development
It features a cable-braced hang glider-style high-wing, weight-shift controls, a two-seats-in-tandem open cockpit with a cockpit fairing, tricycle landing gear with optional wheel pants and a single engine in pusher configuration.

The aircraft is made from bolted-together aluminum tubing, with its double surface wing covered in Dacron sailcloth. Its  span Bautek Pico L wing is supported by a single tube-type kingpost and uses an "A" frame weight-shift control bar. The wing is mounted to a bi-pole type pylon, plus a front strut, which provides additional rigidity and strength. The powerplant is a twin cylinder, liquid-cooled, two-stroke, dual-ignition  Rotax 582 engine or a four stroke BWM 1150 motorcycle engine.

Variants
II Standard
Base model with a cockpit fairing
II Deluxe
Fully equipped model with cockpit fairing and wheel pants

Specifications (II Deluxe)

References

External links

2000s German sport aircraft
2000s German ultralight aircraft
Single-engined pusher aircraft
Ultralight trikes